Gennadi Aleksandrovich Maslyayev (born 21 November 1958) is a Russian professional football coach and a former player. 

He made his professional debut in the Soviet Second League in 1985 for FC Khimik Dzerzhinsk.

He worked as a referee from 1996 to 2001.

References

1958 births
Living people
Soviet footballers
Russian footballers
Russian football referees
Russian football managers
FC Lokomotiv Nizhny Novgorod players
Russian Premier League players
FC Lokomotiv Nizhny Novgorod managers
Association football midfielders
Association football defenders
FC Volga Nizhny Novgorod players
FC Khimik Dzerzhinsk players
FC Torpedo NN Nizhny Novgorod players